Sevilimedu is a part of kanchipuram city in Tamil Nadu, India.

Demographics
 India census, Sevilimedu had a population of 15,918. Males constitute 50% of the population and females 50%. Sevilimedu has an average literacy rate of 73%, higher than the national average of 59.5%: male literacy is 78%, and female literacy is 67%. In Sevilimedu, 10% of the population is under 6 years of age.

References

Cities and towns in Kanchipuram district